Anderson Peters  (born 21 October 1997) is a Grenadian javelin thrower and the current world champion in the event. He is a multiple time CARIFTA Games champion at the discipline and in 2016 earned a bronze medal at the 2016 IAAF World U20 Championships in Bydgoszcz, Poland, setting a new Grenadian national record and OECS record at the same time.

Career
In January 2017 it was announced that Anderson was given a full scholarship to Mississippi State University. He started his season with a throw of 75.29m at the 2017 Bulldog Relays.

At the 2017 edition of the Whitsuntide games at the Kirani James Athletic Stadium, Anderson improved his personal best distance in the Javelin Throw three times. With his final throw we achieved a distance of 81.23 Meters. On 25 June 2017, he was able to further improve on his personal best and National Record with a throw of 83.36m at the Trinidad and Tobago NGC/SAGICOR/NAAA National Open Championships. This throw allowed him to achieve the qualifying standard for the 2017 World Championships in Athletics.  At the 3rd OECS Track And Field Championships held at the Kirani James Athletic Stadium, Anderson further lifted his personal best with a throw of 84.81m. Anderson went on to attend the 2017 World Championships in Athletics in London but was unable to advance beyond the qualifying round with a best effort of 78.99m.

On 23 March during his second outdoor competition of 2018 Anderson registered an 81.95m throw shattering Mississippi State's freshman record in the javelin by more than six meters. The throw moved him to the top of the NCAA leader board and a 4th place World Ranking. He was subsequently named the USTFCCCA NCAA Division I Men's National Athlete of the Week. He also earned Freshman of the Week honors from the Southeastern Conference. He went on to become the Southeastern Conference champion in his event with a throw of 82.04m, a new meet record. On 29 May he was named the SEC Field freshman of the year. After winning the Javelin competition NCAA championship with a new record of 82.82 he was given "All American" honors

In August 2019, Peters won gold at the Pan American Games in the process setting a  games record and national record. Peters also won Grenada's first ever Pan American Games gold medal.

At the World Athletics Championships 2022, Peters successfully defended his world title, beating the Olympic gold medalist Neeraj Chopra with three throws over 90 m. He won a silver medal for Grenada at the 2022 Commonwealth Games with a throw of 88.64 m. On 13 August 2022, Anderson got severely injured after being beaten by five crew members of a party boat.

Peters was appointed Member of the Order of the British Empire (MBE) in the 2022 Birthday Honours for services to sports.

International competitions

Seasonal bests by year

See also
 List of javelin throwers

References

External links

All-athletics profile

1997 births
Living people
Grenadian male javelin throwers
World Athletics Championships athletes for Grenada
World Athletics Championships medalists
World Athletics Championships winners
Commonwealth Games medallists in athletics
Commonwealth Games bronze medallists for Grenada
Athletes (track and field) at the 2018 Commonwealth Games
Competitors at the 2018 Central American and Caribbean Games
Central American and Caribbean Games silver medalists for Grenada
Mississippi State Bulldogs men's track and field athletes
Athletes (track and field) at the 2019 Pan American Games
Pan American Games gold medalists for Grenada
Pan American Games medalists in athletics (track and field)
Pan American Games gold medalists in athletics (track and field)
Central American and Caribbean Games medalists in athletics
Medalists at the 2019 Pan American Games
Athletes (track and field) at the 2020 Summer Olympics
Olympic athletes of Grenada
Members of the Order of the British Empire
Medallists at the 2018 Commonwealth Games